Edmée Pardo Murray (born 5 July 1965) is a Mexican writer and narrator.

Murray was born in Mexico City in 1965. After graduating with a degree in sociology from National Autonomous University of Mexico, she attended Pacifica Graduate Institute in Santa Barbara, California, US. She received further degrees from SOGEM and Instituto Tecnológico Autónomo de México. Murray founded and served as editor of Ediciones Bruges. Her work has been included in several Latin American anthologies.

Selected works

Stories 
Las plegarias de mi boca, 2005
Flor de un solo día, 2002
Rondas de cama y la madera de las cosas, 1999
Loteria, 1995
Pasajes, 1993

Novels 
La voz azul, 2008
Morir de amor, 2002
El sueño de los gatos, 1998
El primo Javier, 1996
Espiral, 1994

Children's literature 
 Enfermedad de escribe con c, 2009
 El brasier de mamá, 2013
 Ese monstruo tiene mi cara, 2014
 Las tres reglas que cambiaron todo, 2014
 Las grandes Ligas, 2015

References

1965 births
Writers from Mexico City
21st-century Mexican women writers
Mexican novelists
Mexican people of Scottish descent
Mexican women children's writers
Living people
National Autonomous University of Mexico alumni
Instituto Tecnológico Autónomo de México alumni